Frances Parthenope Verney, Lady Verney (née Nightingale; 19 April 1819 - 12 May 1890), was an English writer and journalist.

Life 
Parthenope was born in Naples, Italy, and was named after its Greek predecessor, Parthenope. She was the oldest daughter and child of William Nightingale and his wife, Frances Smith. After her parents' three-year tour in Italy, Parthenope and her sister Florence moved to Embley Park, their father's estate in Hampshire, England. Parthenope and her sister were educated at home by a governess, although their father later taught them Greek, Latin, German, French, Italian, history and philosophy. Despite being less scholarly than her sister, Parthenope was fluent in French and developed a love for literature and art.

Although at first opposed to her sister becoming a nurse, Parthenope became an active supporter of Florence's work during the Crimean War.

Marriage and career 
On 24 June 1858, Parthenope married Harry Verney, 2nd Baronet, MP for Buckingham, a supporter of liberal causes and possessor of the family seat, Claydon House. After marriage, the new Lady Verney was able to develop her own talents independent of the shadow of her more famous sister; she soon turned Claydon House into a salon for interesting people, and was responsible for extensively remodelling and restoring Claydon House. She preserved and catalogued the family papers, and began scholarly research into the Verney family.

She began writing stories and articles for Fraser's Magazine, Cornhill Magazine, and Macmillan's Magazine.  She also published five novels; Avenhoe (1867), Stone Edge (1868), Lettice Lisle (1870), Fernyhurst Court (1871), and Llanaly Reefs (1873), and a two-volume book, Peasant Properties and Other Selected Essays. Much of her writing concerned social questions of the day, and ranged from essays on "class morality" to reporting on "the Miseries of War", social differences between the poor of other nations, and religion.

Later years
In later years, the two sisters lived near each other on South Street, London.

Parthenope began suffering from arthritis in her thirties. By the 1880s, she was severely disabled and used assistants to transcribe her writings. She was frequently bedridden. (Bostridge). 

After a long illness with cancer, she died in May 1890 aged 71 at Claydon House. After her death, two collections of her works were published: Essays and Tales and The Grey Pool and Other Stories. Her work on the Verney family papers was completed and published by Margaret Verney as Memoirs of the Verney Family during the Seventeenth Century.

References

External links 

 In a Great Town Hospital, F. P. Verney, Macmillan's Magazine, Vol. L, May to Oct. 1884. pp. 14–22.
 Class Morality, F. P. Verney (no attribution; signed "V."), The Saint Pauls Magazine, Vol. 8, 1871. pp. 259–268.
 The Miseries of War: Notes from Sedan and Bazeilles, F. P. Verney (attribution as "the author of Stone Edge"), The Saint Pauls Magazine, Vol. 8, 1871. pp. 509–524.

1819 births
1890 deaths
Frances
Florence Nightingale
English women journalists
19th-century English women writers
19th-century British writers
19th-century Neapolitan people
Frances
Wives of baronets